The Terrell Subdivision is a railroad line owned by CSX Transportation in the U.S. state of North Carolina. At its southern end the line continues north from the Charlotte Subdivision and at its northern end the line comes to an end at Duke Power.

See also
 List of CSX Transportation lines

References

CSX Transportation lines
North Carolina railroads